Juan Padilla may refer to:

Juan Padilla (pitcher), Puerto Rican baseball pitcher
Juan Padilla (second baseman), Cuban baseball second baseman